"Siéntelo" is a single released by Puerto Rican recording artist Speedy, from his third album, Nueva Generación (2005). It features American recording artist Lumidee.

Track listing
CD-Single
Siéntelo (Motivo Short Mix) - 2:54
Siéntelo (Motivo Long Mix) - 4:37
Siéntelo (Motivo Short Mix) - 3:08
Siéntelo (Motivo Long Mix) - 4:18
Siéntelo (Extended Mix) - 3:48
Siéntelo (DJ Blass Mix) - 2:37

Chart performance

Weekly charts

Year-end charts

References

2003 singles
Lumidee songs
Reggaeton songs
2003 songs
EMI Records singles